Rolpa Airport is an airport in Rolpa District, Lumbini Province, Nepal.

The ICAO code is VNRP and the IATA code is RPA. It is currently not in operation.

See also
 List of airports in Nepal

References

Airports in Nepal
Buildings and structures in Lumbini Province
1980 establishments in Nepal
Buildings and structures in Rolpa District